Maximilian Beyer (born 28 December 1993) is a German racing cyclist, who currently rides for German amateur team Berliner TSC. He rode at the 2015 UCI Track Cycling World Championships.

Major results

2010
 3rd Team pursuit, UCI Junior Track World Championships
2011
 1st  Points race, National Junior Track Championships
2012
 National Track Championships
1st  Scratch
2nd Omnium
3rd Team pursuit
 2nd Team pursuit, UEC European Track Championships
2013
 National Track Championships
1st  Omnium
1st  Scratch
2nd Individual pursuit
3rd Points race
2014
 1st Stage 3 Tour de Berlin
 National Track Championships
2nd Madison
3rd Team pursuit
2015
 3rd Points race, UCI Track Cycling World Championships
2016
 National Track Championships
1st  Omnium
1st  Team pursuit (with Leif Lampater, Lucas Liss and Marco Mathis)
 Bałtyk–Karkonosze Tour
1st Stages 2 & 3
 1st Stage 1 Dookoła Mazowsza
2017
 1st Stage 3 Bałtyk–Karkonosze Tour
 National Track Championships
2nd Madison
2nd Omnium
3rd Points race
3rd Scratch
 3rd Points race, UEC European Track Championships
2018
 3rd Team pursuit, National Track Championships
2019
 National Track Championships
1st  Madison (with Theo Reinhardt)
1st  Omnium
1st  Scratch
 3rd Madison, UEC European Track Championships

References

External links
 

1993 births
Living people
German male cyclists
People from Nordhausen, Thuringia
Cyclists from Thuringia